Aleksi Rekonen (born July 23, 1993) is a Finnish professional ice hockey player. He is currently playing for Lahti Pelicans of the Finnish Liiga.

Rekonen made his Liiga debut playing with Jokerit during the 2013-14 Liiga season.

References

External links

1993 births
Living people
Lahti Pelicans players
Kiekko-Vantaa players
HPK players
Vaasan Sport players
Kokkolan Hermes players
Oulun Kärpät players
Finnish ice hockey centres
Ice hockey people from Helsinki